Steve Michael Cronin (born May 28, 1983 in Sacramento, California) is a retired American soccer player who most recently played for D.C. United of Major League Soccer.

Career

College and Amateur
Cronin played college soccer at Santa Clara University from 2001 to 2003. As a freshman, Cronin started 10 games as a goalkeeper and six in the field, finishing the season with a 0.79 goals against average. For the next two years, Cronin remained solely in goal, starting 27 matches and being named first-team All-West Coast Conference as a junior.

Professional
Following a tremendous performance with the Under-20 national team in the 2003 FIFA World Youth Championship, Cronin signed a Project-40 contract with MLS. He was selected 10th overall in the 2004 MLS SuperDraft by his hometown San Jose Earthquakes. Unfortunately for Cronin, San Jose had two very competent goalkeepers in front of him, 2003 MLS Goalkeeper of the Year Pat Onstad and Jon Conway, and the young keeper did not get any playing time in the 2004 season.

Cronin was traded to Los Angeles Galaxy in the 2005 off-season in a four-player deal and started several games for the Galaxy. He became the Galaxy's starting goalkeeper after Joe Cannon was traded to the San Jose Earthquakes in January 2008. Cronin signed a multi-year contract extension with Galaxy after the 2008 MLS season, but transferred to Portland Timbers in February 2009.

Cronin joined Major League Soccer side D.C. United on 9 October 2009 on loan from Portland until the end of the 2009 MLS season.  His first appearance for DC United was an October 17, 2009 start at home against the Columbus Crew.  Cronin made 6 saves and earned a shutout win. Cronin enjoyed a strong season with Portland in 2010 appearing in 28 league matches, in which he posted a .79 goals against average which included 12 shutouts.

On October 19, 2010 Cronin was named as one of the first four players to be signed by the Portland Timbers ahead of their expansion into Major League Soccer in 2011, along with Bright Dike, Ryan Pore and Eddie Johnson.

On December 17, 2010 Cronin was traded from Portland along with allocation money to D.C. United for goalkeeper Troy Perkins. Cronin remained with D.C. through the 2011 season. At season's end, the club declined his 2012 contract option and he entered the 2011 MLS Re-Entry Draft. Cronin was not selected in the draft and became a free agent.

International
As a teenager, Cronin trained with the Under-17 United States national team at the USSF's Bradenton Academy, alongside players like Landon Donovan, DaMarcus Beasley, and Bobby Convey. He made his international debut with the team against Sweden on November 26, 1998.

He was called up for the United States national team camp before the game against Sweden on January 19, 2008, but was the only unused substitute in the match.

Retirement
On April 13, 2012 Cronin announced he was becoming a State Farm insurance agent. He opened his office in Denver, Colorado on March 1, 2013.

Honors

Los Angeles Galaxy
Major League Soccer MLS Cup (1): 2005

Portland Timbers
USL First Division Commissioner's Cup (1): 2009

Individual
USL First Division All-League First Team (1): 2009

References

External links
 Steve Cronin Player experience
 

Santa Clara profile

1983 births
Living people
American soccer players
Santa Clara Broncos men's soccer players
San Jose Earthquakes players
LA Galaxy players
Portland Timbers (2001–2010) players
D.C. United players
Association football goalkeepers
USL First Division players
USSF Division 2 Professional League players
Major League Soccer players
United States men's youth international soccer players
United States men's under-20 international soccer players
Soccer players from Sacramento, California
San Jose Earthquakes draft picks